The Flying Dutchman or  De Vliegende Hollander is a 1995 Dutch comedy film directed by Jos Stelling.

Plot
Flanders, 16th century. The random son of a rogue is trusted to the bike of a crazy minstrel and goes in search of his father to the cold sea. With him he takes a girlfriend, a golden chalice and, most importantly, faith in his goal. However, fate is trying to take away from the Dutch all that he has, even life.

Cast
 René Groothof as Harander
 Nino Manfredi as Campanelli
 Veerle Dobbelaere as Bobby
 René Van 't Hof as Dwerg
 Gene Bervoets as Zoon Van Netelneck
 Gerard Thoolen as Gevangenisdirecteur
 Willy Vandermeulen as Netelneck
 Michiel Groothof as Kleine Hollander
 Josse De Pauw	as Hoedelaar
 Ingrid De Vos as Moeder Hollander
 Senne Rouffaer as Hennetaster
 Bert André as Cackpot
 Niels Vandormael as Kleine Netelneck
 Ronald de Keersmaeker as Jonge Zoon Netelneck
 Jan Steen as Pisser
 Daniel Emilfork as Ketterjager
 Eric Roberts as Sean

References

External links 
 

1995 films
1990s Dutch-language films
1995 comedy films
Films directed by Jos Stelling
Films set in the 16th century
Dutch comedy films
Films scored by Nicola Piovani